Peter Kingsbery is an American singer-songwriter who co-founded the band Cock Robin in the 1980s. He grew up in Austin (Texas) where he studied classical music. He moved to Nashville (Tennessee) where he began his career as a musician (he accompanied Brenda Lee on piano on a few tours) and then to Los Angeles at the end of the '70s where he began a career as a singer-songwriter. He composed a few songs for Smokey Robinson, and one of his compositions, Pilot Error, sung by Stephanie Mills, had some success in the dance charts in 1983. At the beginning of the 80s, he founded the group Cock Robin with Anna LaCazio, Clive Wright and Lou Molino III which enjoyed great success in Western Europe mainly. Failing to break their native country with a first self-titled album in 1985, the quartet became a duo of Kingsbery and LaCazio when they released their second album in 1987. After the band split up in the early 1990s after their third album, Kingsbery enjoyed a fairly successful solo career, releasing four albums over a decade, and scoring a major hit in France with the song "Only the Very Best." With his fourth album he tried his luck singing in French, the language of his adopted country (living there since some years back).

He has since reformed Cock Robin with Anna LaCazio and on/off former member Clive Wright in 2006 and has released one studio album I Don't Want to Save the World the same year and a Live album in 2009. A new studio album Songs From A Bell Tower was released in October 2010.

Solo career 
After the band split in 1990, Peter Kingsbery pursued a solo career in France, where he settled. Kingsbery speaks fluent French and is much more famous in France than he is in his native US.

After signing with a new label (Barclay), he recorded his first solo album A Different Man in 1991 in California that he co-produced with his friend, drummer Pat Mastelotto. Kingsbery broadened his skills by not only playing the piano or organ but also the accordion. Breaking with the style of Cock Robin, he introduced more classical instruments such as wind instruments (saxophone, flute, trombone and euphonium) or traditional as the oud (or lute, giving Slavic accents to the song Hélène). Other than Mastelotto, some of the musicians who recorded this album with Kingsbery participated Cock Robin: Clive Wright, John Pierce, Corky James and Tim Pierce. Phil Solem of The Rembrandts, also contributed to this album. Contrary to what he used to do in the Cock Robin albums, Kingsbery recorded a cover version of How Can I Be Sure, a hit by the band The Rascals dating from 1968. The album which originally included 10 songs, was re-released with 2 extra tracks "Love In Motion" and "The Sublime" for the international market. It was followed by a tour in France, where he only played the piano in small clubs all over the country and Paris (in 1992, he played to a packed Théâtre Grévin).

Shortly after, Kingsbery participated in the concept album musical Tycoon, the English version of the French cult musical Starmania by Michel Berger & Luc Plamondon, with English lyrics by Tim Rice. He sang Only The Very Best, which became a major hit in France in 1992, and also the song Ego Trip on the album.

A few years later, in 1995, he released his second solo album Once in a Million. Recorded in various studios (in Los Angeles, London, Paris, Toulouse, Biarritz and Brussels), he continued to use classical instruments (strings, trumpet and harmonica). Besides his usual contributing musicians like Clive Wright and Pat Mastelotto, he enrolled some French players with the likes of drummer Hervé Coster or jazz musician Stéphane Belmondo. This album was also followed by a tour in small venues in France.

Released in 1997, Pretty Ballerina, the third solo studio album stands out from the others for several reasons. First, it's been entirely recorded in France (Charenton, Carpentras and Paris) with the participation of French front musicians such as Mathieu Chedid. Also, uniquely in the discography of this singer-songwriter, the album title is not taken from one of his original songs but from the American band The Left Banke's song dating from 1966 to 1967. Lastly, it includes a few reprises, notably Brand New Year in a new version from Kingsbery's own previous album, but most of all the song More Than Willing, from Cock Robin's first album, where Anna LaCazio his ex-partner in the band sings with him again, hinting at a reunion that would eventually happen a few years later.

The recording pace slows down in the years that followed, Kingsbery continuing to perform in small venues. It was not until 2002 that the singer's new album could be found in stores, completely atypical both in style and in the language: with the exception of one song, the CD is entirely sung in French. It was an audacious gamble, and Kingsbery for once did not write the lyrics but had to ask a French songwriter, Patrice Guirao for help. It is also musically daring with a large emphasis placed on synths and rhythmic power.

None of the four albums by Peter Kingsbery have achieved the success of the Cock Robin ones and Kingsbery never returned to his previous level of popularity, not even in France. In 2006, Peter Kingsbery found himself again at the front of the stage with the return of Cock Robin.

In June 2012, Peter Kingsbery was the featured vocalist on Danish duo Terminal Argh's debut-single "Middle of a Western", digitally released by Mabel The Label. Lyrics and melodies by Peter Kingsbery, music and production by Umpff.

Discography 
 1991: A Different Man
 1995: Once in a Million
 1997: Pretty Ballerina
 2002: Mon Inconnue
 2014: Much Taller Than on the Internet (Mini-album and film in collaboration with Umpff).

See also the Cock Robin discography.

References 

 http://nyahl.net/15once.html

External links 
 Soundcloud page for Much Taller Than On The Internet
 Official MySpace page
 Cock Robin/Peter Kingsbery.net (site entirely in Flash)
 International Cock Robin discussion page

American expatriates in France
American rock songwriters
American rock musicians
American male singer-songwriters
American rock singers
American pop pianists
American male pianists
Living people
1952 births
Cock Robin (band) members
Musicians from Austin, Texas
Singer-songwriters from Texas
20th-century American pianists
21st-century American pianists
20th-century American male musicians
21st-century American male musicians